George Partridge Sanger (November 27, 1819 – July 3, 1890) was an American lawyer, editor, judge, and businessman who served as the United States Attorney for the District of Massachusetts from 1873 to 1886 and was the first president of the John Hancock Mutual Life Insurance Company.

Early life
Sanger was born on November 27, 1819 in Dover, Massachusetts. He graduated from Harvard University in 1840 and after spending two years as a teacher in Portsmouth, New Hampshire, returned to Harvard as a Latin tutor and a law student.

Legal career
Sanger graduated from Harvard Law School in 1844 and was admitted to the bar in 1846. He spent the next three years practicing law in Boston, first with Stephen Henry Phillips, and later with Charles G. Davis. In 1849 Sanger was named Assistant United States Attorney for the District of Massachusetts.

Sanger was a member of the Charlestown, Massachusetts Common Council from 1849 to 1850 and the Board of Aldermen from 1851 to 1853.

In January 1853, he was appointed to the staff of Governor John H. Clifford. In September of that year he was appointed District Attorney for Suffolk County, Massachusetts. The following year he was appointed Judge of the Massachusetts Court of Common Pleas. He remained on the bench until the Court was abolished in 1859.

In 1860 he was a member of the Boston Common Council.

From 1861 to 1869 Sanger again served as District Attorney for Suffolk County, Massachusetts.

In 1873 he was a member of the Massachusetts House of Representatives. Following the death of David H. Mason, President Ulysses S. Grant appointed Sanger United States Attorney for the District of Massachusetts. He remained in this role until 1882.

Editor
Sanger worked for Little, Brown and Company, where he was responsible for editing the Law Reporter and The United States Statutes at Large.

From 1842 to 1860 he was the editor of the American Almanac.

John Hancock Insurance
On October 14, 1862, the John Hancock Mutual Life Insurance Company's Board of Directors elected Sanger the first president of the company. He held this position until August 1863.

Personal life
Sanger married Elizabeth Sherburne Thompson of Portsmouth, New Hampshire in 1846.  The couple had four sons:
John White Sanger
William Thompson Sanger
George Partridge Sanger Jr.
Charles Robert Sanger.

Death
Sanger died on July 3, 1890 in Swampscott, Massachusetts.

References

1831 births
1894 deaths
People from Dover, Massachusetts
People from Charlestown, Boston
Lawyers from Boston
People from Swampscott, Massachusetts
Members of the Massachusetts House of Representatives
Harvard Law School alumni
American editors
Massachusetts state court judges
United States Attorneys for the District of Massachusetts
District attorneys in Suffolk County, Massachusetts
19th-century American politicians
19th-century American judges
19th-century American lawyers